The 1993–94 South Pacific cyclone season was a near average tropical cyclone season with five tropical cyclones occurring within the South Pacific to the east of 160°E. The season officially ran from November 1, 1993, to April 30, 1994, with the first disturbance of the season forming on December 26 and the last disturbance dissipating on April 25.

During the season, tropical cyclones were officially monitored by the Regional Specialized Meteorological Center (RSMC) in Nadi, Fiji, and the Tropical Cyclone Warning Centers (TCWC) in Brisbane, Australia and Wellington, New Zealand. Throughout the season the United States Navy also monitored the basin and issued unofficial warnings, through its Joint Typhoon Warning Center (JTWC) and Naval Western and Oceanography Center (NWOC). Tropical cyclones that were located between 160°E and 120°W as well as the Equator and 25°S were monitored by RSMC Nadi while any that were located to the south of 25°S between 160°E and 120°W were monitored by TCWC Wellington. During the season the JTWC issued warnings on any tropical cyclone that was located between 160°E and 180° while the NPMOC issued warnings for tropical cyclones forming between the 180° and the American coast. RSMC Nadi and TCWC Wellington both used the Australian Tropical Cyclone Intensity Scale, and measured windspeeds over a 10-minute period during the season, while the JTWC and the NPMOC measured sustained windspeeds over a 1 -minute period.

Seasonal summary

Systems

Severe Tropical Cyclone Rewa 

Early on December 26, the JTWC started to monitor a tropical disturbance that had developed about 575 km (355 mi) to the south-east of Nauru. Over the next couple of days the disturbance gradually developed as it moved towards the south-southwest under the influence of a north-easterly flow. Early on December 28, TCWC Nadi started to monitor the disturbance as a tropical depression. Later that day, the JTWC classified the depression as Tropical Cyclone 05P, before TCWC Nadi reported that the system had intensified into a category 1 tropical cyclone on the Australian tropical cyclone intensity scale and named it Rewa. Over the next few days, the system gradually intensified under the influence of favourable upper-level winds while it moved towards the south-southwest, passing through the Solomon Islands on December 29 and affecting the southeastern islands of Papua New Guinea. As it moved through the Solomon Islands, Rewa moved out of the South Pacific basin and into the Australian region.

After affecting New Caledonia, Rewa weakened into a tropical depression and moved towards the northwest over the next few days, before re-entering the Australian basin during January 10 and started to show signs of reintensification. Over the next few days the cyclone moved towards the north north-west and started to affect Papua New Guinea for the second time before it was renamed Rewa during January 13 while it recurved and started to move towards the south-west. Over the next few days the cyclone continued to move to the south-east towards the South Pacific basin, before as it peaked in intensity on January 16 as a category 5 severe tropical cyclone, Rewa turned and started to move towards the south-west. Over the next few days, the cyclone gradually weakened while it moved towards the south-west and a predicted landfall near Mackay in Queensland. However, during January 18, Rewa interacted with an upper level trough and as a result turned and started to move towards the south-east along the Queensland coast. Rewa then degenerated into an extratropical cyclone during January 20, with its remnants last noted bringing heavy rain to New Zealand on January 23.

Tropical Cyclone 07P 

On January 6, the NPMOC reported that Tropical Cyclone 07P, had developed out of an area of low pressure, that had persisted for several days near Fiji with peak windspeeds of 55 km/h (35 mph) equivalent to a tropical depression. During the next day the depression remained broad and poorly organized as it moved towards the southeast. Later that day 07P moved across Tonga's northern islands, before the NPMOC issued their final advisory on January 8 as the system weakened into a remnant low.

Severe Tropical Cyclone Sarah 

On January 18, a weak low pressure area developed to the north of Fiji, within a trough of low pressure that extended from a weakening Cyclone Rewa to the northwest of Fiji. Over the next few days the low moved towards the west and passed between the Vanuation islands of Vila and Santo on January 21. Once the low had moved into the Coral Sea it started to rapidly develop further, with both RSMC Nadi and the JTWC reporting early on January 22, that the low had developed into a tropical cyclone, with the latter naming it Sarah.

Severe Tropical Cyclone Theodore 

Severe Tropical Cyclone Theodore existed from February 26 to March 3.

Severe Tropical Cyclone Tomas 

Severe Tropical Cyclone Tomas existed from March 19 to March 27.

Tropical Cyclone Usha 

Late on March 24, the newly developed Tropical Cyclone Usha, moved into the South Pacific basin as a category 1 tropical cyclone.

Tropical Depression 29P 

During that day the disturbance moved towards the southeast and passed over several of the Solomon Islands, before emerging into the Australian basin. Over the next couple of days the disturbance gradually developed further while moving towards the southwest before re-curving and moving southeastwards. On April 24, as it moved back into the South Pacific basin, the JTWC initiated advisories on the disturbance, designating it as Tropical Cyclone 29P, with peak windspeeds equivalent to a tropical depression. As the system was classified, it recurved again and started to move slowly towards the northwest, and started to feel the effects of a high amount of vertical windshear.

Season effects 
This table lists all the storms that developed in the South Pacific basin during the 1993–94 season. It includes their intensity on the Australian Tropical cyclone intensity scale, duration, name, areas affected, deaths, and damages.

See also 

 Atlantic hurricane seasons: 1993, 1994
 Pacific hurricane seasons: 1993, 1994
 Pacific typhoon seasons: 1993, 1994
 North Indian Ocean cyclone seasons: 1993, 1994

Notes

References

External links 

 
South Pacific cyclone seasons
Articles which contain graphical timelines